Grobben's gerbil (Gerbillus grobbeni) is a species of rodent, distributed mainly in Libya; Cyrenaica, Dernah.  Less than 250 individuals of this species are thought to persist in the wild. It is named after Austrian biologist Karl Grobben.

References

  Database entry includes a brief justification of why this species is listed as data deficient

Gerbillus
Rodents of North Africa
Endemic fauna of Libya
Mammals described in 1909